Frederick Morley (1 March 1888 – 4 June 1970) was an English professional football inside forward who began his career in England before finishing it in the American Soccer League. He was born in Burslem, England.

Career 
Morley began his career with Reading of the Southern League. In 1909, he transferred to Blackpool, then in the Second Division. He saw time in eighty league games before leaving the team in 1912. There is a six-year gap in his career records as he is then shown signing with Brentford in August 1918. In March 1921, Morley injured his knee. Trainers informed him it was most likely a career-ending injury. Morley left England and moved to the United States. That Fall, he signed with Philadelphia Field Club of the American Soccer League. Philadelphia was created when Bethlehem Steel moved to Philadelphia for the inaugural ASL season. A powerhouse team, Philadelphia took the league championship, but the ownership moved it back to Bethlehem at the end of the season. Morley moved to J&P Coats for one season before joined the Fall River Marksmen in 1923. During his four seasons in Fall River, Morley and his teammates won three league titles and two National Challenge Cup titles. While Morley was never a prolific goal scorer, in the 1924 National Challenge Cup final, he scored two goals as the Marksmen defeated St. Louis Vesper Buick 4–2. Morley's career records have another gap between 1927 and 1928 when he is not listed with any team. In 1928, he signed with J&P Coats, but played only two games before retiring. Following his retirement, he coached the Fall River Marksmen.

Personal life 
Morley served in the Royal Garrison Artillery during the First World War.

Honours 
Brentford
 London Combination: 1918–19

References

1888 births
Military personnel from Staffordshire
English footballers
Reading F.C. players
Blackpool F.C. players
Brentford F.C. players
American Soccer League (1921–1933) players
Philadelphia Field Club players
J&P Coats players
Fall River Marksmen players
American Soccer League (1921–1933) coaches
Sportspeople from Burslem
1970 deaths
English Football League players
Association football forwards
English expatriate sportspeople in the United States
Expatriate soccer players in the United States
English expatriate footballers
British Army personnel of World War I
Royal Garrison Artillery soldiers
English football managers